Harry Kondoleon was a gay American playwright and novelist. He was born on February 26, 1955. He died of AIDS' companion infections in New York City on March 16, 1994, aged 39.

He graduated from Hamilton College and the Yale School of Drama.  He was awarded the Fulbright, National Endowment for the Arts, Rockefeller and Guggenheim fellowships.

Works

Plays
The Brides - 1980
The Côte d'Azur Triangle - 1980
Rococo - 1981
Self-Torture and Strenuous Exercise - 1982
Andrea Rescued - 1982
Clara Toil - 1982
The Fairy Garden - 1982
Christmas on Mars - 1983
Slacks and Tops - 1983
Linda Her - 1984
The Vampires - 1984
Anteroom - 1985
Play Yourself - 1988
The Poet's Corner - 1988
Zero Positive - 1988
Love Diatribe - 1990
The Houseguests - 1993
Saved or Destroyed - 1994

Novels
The Whore of Tiampuan - 1991 
Diary of a Lost Boy - 1994

Poetry
Rudy on Ruby and Nadine (Wedge pamphlet)
The Death of Understanding: Love Poems - 1987

Awards
1982-1983 Obie Award for "most promising young playwright" (Shared with Tina Howe (for "distinguished playwriting"), and David Mamet (for Edmond))
1984-1985 Obie Award to Elizabeth Wilson for her role in Kondoleon's "Anteroom"
1992-1993 Obie Award for "The Houseguests"
2000-2001 Obie Award to Craig Lucas for directing "Saved or Destroyed"

References

Playwright's Page on Dooleee.com
Playwright's Horizons Awards Page
Article about a posthumous festival of Kondoleon's works in 2000
Obituary

External links
Article about "The Fairy Garden" and Kondoleon's work
Village Voice Review of "Saved or Destroyed"
Article on Kondoleon's The Houseguests, camp, and the philosophy of Kierkegaard
Harry Kondoleon at Internet Off-Broadway Database
Harry Kondoleon Papers at Fales Library and Special Collections at New York University
Article on Harry Kondoleon's poetry and translations of four of his poems in Greek for online literary magazine ΑΣΣΟΔΥΟ by Natasha Remoundou (Athens, 2023)

1955 births
1994 deaths
Yale School of Drama alumni
Hamilton College (New York) alumni
Obie Award recipients
American male dramatists and playwrights
American male novelists
American gay writers
American LGBT dramatists and playwrights
American LGBT novelists
20th-century American male writers
20th-century American dramatists and playwrights
20th-century American novelists
Gay dramatists and playwrights
Gay novelists
AIDS-related deaths in New York (state)
20th-century American LGBT people